Brandon James Lyon (born August 10, 1979) is an American former professional baseball pitcher. He played in Major League Baseball (MLB) for the Toronto Blue Jays, Boston Red Sox, Arizona Diamondbacks, Detroit Tigers, Houston Astros, and New York Mets.

Professional career

Toronto Blue Jays
Lyon made his major league debut halfway through the 2001 season, posting a five-win, four-loss record for the Toronto Blue Jays, with a 4.29 ERA from 11 starts. He was the second youngest winning pitcher in Blue Jays' history after winning on debut (2–1 over Baltimore).

2002, however, was a different story. Lyon started the season as a starter for the Jays, but lost three of his first four decisions of the season, including a career-high 7 earned runs against the Yankees on April 10, and against the Angels on May 3. Three weeks later, Lyon was kicked from the rotation, and placed in the bullpen. He made his debut in this role at the SkyDome, against Boston, pitching 3 innings. In five games of relief, Lyon had no decisions against him with a 5.19 ERA.

Boston Red Sox
During the postseason, the Red Sox claimed Lyon off waivers.

Boston made Lyon a permanent reliever, and Lyon appeared in 49 games in 2003, converting 9 saves in 12 opportunities with 50 strikeouts in 59 innings pitched. Lyon missed the entire 2004 season due to injury, after having been traded along with Casey Fossum, Michael Goss and Jorge de la Rosa to Arizona in exchange for Curt Schilling.

Arizona Diamondbacks
Lyon improved in 2005, converting 14 saves in 15 opportunities while pitching in 32 games and spending part of the season as the Diamondbacks' closer, replacing the injured José Valverde. However, he spent most of the second half on the disabled list. In 2006, Lyon had a very solid season, posting a 2–4 record and a 3.89 ERA in 68 appearances. In 2007, Lyon had probably his best season yet, with a 6–4 record, 2 saves, and the best ERA of his career, at a sparkling 2.68 in 73 games. Lyon found his niche as the Diamondbacks' primary setup man, pitching in front of Valverde, as Arizona won the NL West division title. However, he lost the job to Chad Qualls following second-half struggles.

Detroit Tigers
On January 24, the Detroit Tigers signed Lyon to a one-year contract. Lyon's Tiger season started off horrendously: Lyon compiled an ERA of 4.91 in April and a whopping 8.10 in May. From June on, Lyon redeemed himself somewhat by compiling a 1.56 ERA in 57 innings. Lyon was used as a set-up man for Tigers closer Fernando Rodney. On November 10, 2009 Lyon filed for free agency.

Houston Astros
On December 12, 2009 Lyon signed with the Houston Astros to a 3-year deal, worth $15 million.

Return to the Toronto Blue Jays
Lyon was traded to the Blue Jays on July 20, 2012, along with J. A. Happ, and David Carpenter, for Francisco Cordero, Ben Francisco, Asher Wojciechowski, David Rollins, Joe Musgrove, Carlos Pérez, and a player to be named later (Kevin Comer).

New York Mets
On February 7, 2013, it was announced that the New York Mets and Lyon had reached an agreement on a one-year contract, which became official on February 8.
Lyon was designated for assignment on July 4, 2013. On July 9, Lyon was released.

Return to the Boston Red Sox
On July 19, 2013, The Boston Red Sox and Lyon had reached an agreement to a minor league contract. He was granted his release when informed he would not make the big league club.

Los Angeles Angels of Anaheim
On February 10, 2014, Lyon signed a  minor league contract with the Los Angeles of Anaheim. On May 20, 2014, Lyon elected free agency after spending all season in Triple-A.

Pitching style
Lyon used an arsenal of five pitches: a four-seam fastball at 90–92 mph, a two-seamer at 90–91, a cutter at 89–91, and a curveball at 78–80. Occasionally, he also throws a changeup to left-handed hitters (85–87). Lyon's most commonly thrown pitch to right-handed hitters (and overall) is the cutter, while his lead pitch against lefties is the two-seamer. The curve is his most common 2-strike pitch.

See also

 Best pitching seasons by a Detroit Tiger

References

External links

1979 births
Living people
Baseball players from Utah
American expatriate baseball players in Canada
Major League Baseball pitchers
Toronto Blue Jays players
Boston Red Sox players
Arizona Diamondbacks players
Detroit Tigers players
Houston Astros players
New York Mets players
Utah Tech Trailblazers baseball players
Queens Kings players
Tennessee Smokies players
Syracuse SkyChiefs players
Pawtucket Red Sox players
Tucson Sidewinders players
Oklahoma City RedHawks players